The Muskingum River is a tributary of the Ohio River, approximately  long, in southeastern Ohio in the United States. An important commercial route in the 19th century, it flows generally southward through the eastern hill country of Ohio.  Via the Ohio, it is part of the Mississippi River watershed.  The river is navigable for much of its length through a series of locks and dams.

Course
The Muskingum is formed at Coshocton in east-central Ohio by the confluence of the Walhonding and Tuscarawas rivers. It flows in a meandering course southward past Conesville and Dresden to Zanesville, and then southeastward past South Zanesville, Philo, Gaysport, Malta, McConnelsville, Beverly, Lowell, Stockport and Devola. It joins the Ohio at Marietta.

Along its course the Muskingum collects Wills Creek near Conesville; Wakatomika Creek at Dresden; the Licking River at Zanesville; Moxahala Creek at South Zanesville; and Wolf Creek near Beverly.

History
The name Muskingum derives from the Shawnee word mshkikwam 'swampy ground'. In Lenape Muskingum was taken to mean 'elk's eye' (mus wəshkinkw) by folk etymology, as if < mus 'elk'  + wəshkinkw 'its eye'. Moravian missionary David Zeisberger wrote that the Muskingum River was called Elk's Eye "because of the numbers of elk that formerly fed on its banks, these animals being found there even at the present time [1779-1780]..." Historically, it was also the name of a large Wyandot town along the river.

As part of an expedition to assert French dominance throughout the entire Ohio valley, on August 15, 1749, a leaden plate claiming the region for France was buried at the confluence of the Muskingum and Ohio rivers by Pierre Joseph Céloron.

Noted frontier explorer Christopher Gist reached the Big Sandy Creek tributary of the river on December 4, 1751. Traveling downriver, he recorded arriving on December 14 at the western Wyandot town of Muskingum, at present-day Coshocton.  There he remained for the following month.

Marietta was founded in 1788 as the first permanent American settlement in the Northwest Territory, at the mouth of the Muskingum River on the Ohio River.  The Big Bottom Massacre occurred along its banks in 1791.

Zanesville was settled by European Americans in 1799 at the site where Zane's Trace crossed the Muskingum at the mouth of the Licking River.  In the mid-19th century the Muskingum was an important commercial shipping route, with dams and locks controlling the water level to allow boats to travel up and down the river. With the decrease in use of water-based transportation in Ohio by the 1920s, the locks fell into disrepair.

Since the 1960s, the locks have been repaired to enable pleasure craft to travel the entire navigable length of the river. The Muskingum waterway is one of the few remaining systems in the US to use hand-operated river locks. The navigation system has been designated a national Historic Civil Engineering Landmark. In 2006, it was designated "An Ohio Water Trail;" this designation provides for increased canoe access on the river.

Located north of the Mason–Dixon line, from around 1812 to 1861 the Muskingum River was a major Underground Railroad route used by fugitive slaves escaping from the South on their journey north to Lake Erie and Canada.

Nonprofit organizations
The Friends of the Lower Muskingum River is a 501 (c) (3) nonprofit land trust based in Marietta, Ohio, concerned with protection of the Muskingum River and adjacent lands. The Muskingum Watershed Conservancy District is a quasi-governmental entity concerned with flood control on the river.

Variant names
According to the Geographic Names Information System, the Muskingum River has also been known as:
 Big Muskingum River
 Elk River
 Mouskindom River
 Mushkingum River
 Muskingham River
 Riviere Chiagnez

See also
 List of rivers of Ohio
 Muskingum River Power Plant
 Y-Bridge (Zanesville, Ohio)

References

External links
 A history-travel guide on the Ohio and Muskingum Rivers

 
Rivers of Ohio
Tributaries of the Ohio River
Rivers of Coshocton County, Ohio
Rivers of Morgan County, Ohio
Rivers of Muskingum County, Ohio
Rivers of Washington County, Ohio